The Caribbean is a subregion of the Americas that consists of the Caribbean Sea and its islands (some surrounded by the Caribbean Sea and some bordering both the Caribbean Sea and the North Atlantic Ocean), the nearby coastal areas on the mainland may also be included. The region is southeast of the Gulf of Mexico and the North American mainland, east of Central America, and north of South America.

Situated largely on the Caribbean Plate, the region has more than 700 islands, islets, reefs, and cays (see the list of Caribbean islands). Island arcs delineate the northern and eastern edges of the Caribbean Sea: the Greater Antilles in the north and the Lesser Antilles (which includes the Leeward Antilles) in the east and south. The nearby Lucayan Archipelago (comprising The Bahamas and the Turks and Caicos Islands) is considered to be a part of the Caribbean despite not bordering the Caribbean Sea. All the islands in the Antilles plus the Lucayan Archipelago form the West Indies, which is often interchangeable with the term Caribbean. On the mainland, Belize, Guyana, and Suriname are often included as parts of the Caribbean due to their political and cultural ties with the region.

Geopolitically, the islands of the Caribbean are often regarded as a subregion of North America, though sometimes they are included in Middle America or left as a subregion of their own and are organized into 33 political entities, including 13 sovereign states, 12 dependencies, 1 disputed territory, and 7 other overseas territories. From December 15, 1954, to October 10, 2010, there was a territory known as the Netherlands Antilles composed of five islands, all of which were Dutch dependencies.  From January 3, 1958, to May 31, 1962, there was also a short-lived political union called the West Indies Federation composed of ten English-speaking Caribbean territories, all of which were then British dependencies. The West Indies cricket team continues to represent many of those nations.

Etymology and pronunciation
The region takes its name from that of the Caribs, an ethnic group present in the Lesser Antilles and parts of adjacent South America at the time of the Spanish conquest of the Americas.

Most authorities of the last century preferred the stress on the third syllable. This is the older of the two pronunciations, but the stressed-second-syllable variant has been established for over 75 years. It has been suggested that speakers of British English prefer  while North American speakers more typically use , but major American dictionaries and other sources list the stress on the third syllable as more common in American English too. According to the American version of Oxford Online Dictionaries, the stress on the second syllable is becoming more common in UK English and is increasingly considered "by some" to be more up to date and more "correct".

The Oxford Online Dictionaries claim that the stress on the second syllable is the most common pronunciation in the Caribbean itself, but according to the Dictionary of Caribbean English Usage, the most common pronunciation in Caribbean English stresses the first syllable instead, .

Definition

The word "Caribbean" has multiple uses. Its principal ones are geographical and political. The Caribbean can also be expanded to include territories with strong cultural and historical connections to Africa, slavery, European colonisation and the plantation system.
 The United Nations geoscheme for the Americas presents the Caribbean as a distinct region within the Americas.
 Physiographically, the Caribbean region is mainly a chain of islands surrounding the Caribbean Sea. To the north, the region is bordered by the Gulf of Mexico, the Straits of Florida and the Northern Atlantic Ocean, which lies to the east and northeast. To the south lies the coastline of the continent of South America.

Countries and territories of the Caribbean today

History

The oldest evidence of humans in the Caribbean is in southern Trinidad at Banwari Trace, where remains have been found from seven thousand years ago. These pre-ceramic sites, which belong to the Archaic (pre-ceramic) age, have been termed Ortoiroid. The earliest archaeological evidence of human settlement in Hispaniola dates to about 3600 BC, but the reliability of these finds is questioned. Consistent dates of 3100 BC appear in Cuba. The earliest dates in the Lesser Antilles are from 2000 BC in Antigua. A lack of pre-ceramic sites in the Windward Islands and differences in technology suggest that these Archaic settlers may have Central American origins. Whether an Ortoiroid colonization of the islands took place is uncertain, but there is little evidence of one.

DNA studies changed some of the traditional beliefs about pre-Columbian indigenous history. According to National Geographic, "studies confirm that a wave of pottery-making farmers—known as Ceramic Age people—set out in canoes from the northeastern coast of South America starting some 2,500 years ago and island-hopped across the Caribbean. They were not, however, the first colonizers. On many islands they encountered a foraging people who arrived some 6,000 or 7,000 years ago...The ceramicists, who are related to today's Arawak-speaking peoples, supplanted the earlier foraging inhabitants—presumably through disease or violence—as they settled new islands."

Between 400 BC and 200 BC the first ceramic-using agriculturalists, the Saladoid culture, entered Trinidad from South America. They expanded up the Orinoco River to Trinidad, and then spread rapidly up the islands of the Caribbean. Some time after 250 AD another group, the Barancoid, entered Trinidad. The Barancoid society collapsed along the Orinoco around 650 AD and another group, the Arauquinoid, expanded into these areas and up the Caribbean chain. Around 1300 AD a new group, the Mayoid, entered Trinidad and remained the dominant culture until Spanish settlement.

At the time of the European discovery of most of the islands of the Caribbean, three major Amerindian indigenous peoples lived on the islands: the Taíno in the Greater Antilles, the Bahamas and the Leeward Islands, the Island Caribs and Galibi in the Windward Islands, and the Ciboney in western Cuba. The Taínos are subdivided into Classic Taínos, who occupied Hispaniola and Puerto Rico, Western Taínos, who occupied Cuba, Jamaica, and the Bahamian archipelago, and the Eastern Taínos, who occupied the Leeward Islands. Trinidad was inhabited by both Carib speaking and Arawak-speaking groups.

European Contact 

Soon after Christopher Columbus came to the Caribbean, both Portuguese and Spanish explorers began claiming territories in Central and South America. These early colonies brought gold to Europe; most specifically England, the Netherlands, and France. These nations hoped to establish profitable colonies in the Caribbean. Colonial rivalries made the Caribbean a cockpit for European wars for centuries.

Columbus, and the early colonists of Hispaniola, treated the indigenous peoples brutally, even enslaving children. In 1512, after pressure from Dominican friars, the Laws of Burgos were introduced by the Spanish Crown to better protect the rights of the New World natives. The Spanish used a form of slavery called the Encomienda, where slaves would be awarded to the conquistadors, who were charged with protecting and converting their slaves. This had a devastating impact on the population, so starting in 1503, slaves from Africa were imported to the colony.

While early slave traders were Portuguese and Spanish, known as the First Atlantic System, by the 17th century the trade became dominated by British, French, and Dutch merchants. This was known as the Second Atlantic System. 5 million African slaves would be taken to the Caribbean, and around half would be traded to the British Caribbean islands. Slavery was abolished first in the Dutch Empire in 1814. Spain abolished slavery in its empire in 1811, with the exceptions of Cuba, Puerto Rico, and Santo Domingo. Slavery was not abolished in Cuba until 1886. Britain abolished the slave trade in 1807, and slavery proper in 1833. France abolished slavery in its colonies in 1848.
	
The Caribbean was known for pirates, especially between 1640 and 1680. The term "buccaneer" is often used to describe a pirate operating in this region. The Caribbean region was war-torn throughout much of its colonial history, but the wars were often based in Europe, with only minor battles fought in the Caribbean. Some wars, however, were born of political turmoil in the Caribbean itself.

In 1791, a slave rebellion in the French colony of Saint-Domingue led to the establishment in 1804 of Haiti, the first republic in the Caribbean. Cuba became independent in 1898 following American intervention in the War of Independence during the Spanish-American war. Following the war, Spain's last colony in the Americas, Puerto Rico, became an unincorporated territory of the United States.

Decolonisation and Modern period 
Between the 1960s and 80s, most of the British holdings in the Caribbean achieved independence, starting with Jamaica in 1962, then Trinidad and Tobago (1962), Barbados (1966), Bahamas (1973), Grenada (1974), Dominica (1978), St. Lucia (1979), St. Vincent (1979), Antigua and Barbuda (1981), St. Kitts and Nevis (1983). Presently, the United States, Britain, France and the Netherlands still have some Caribbean possessions.

The decline of the export industries meant a need to diversify the economies of the Caribbean territories. The tourism industry started developing in the early 20th century, rapidly developing in the 1960s when regular international flights made vacations affordable and is now a $50 billion industry. Another industry that developed in the early 20th century was offshore banking and financial services, particularly in The Bahamas and the Cayman Islands, as the proximity of the Caribbean islands to the United States made them an attractive location for branches of foreign banks seeking to avoid taxes.

US interventions

The United States has conducted military operations in the Caribbean for at least 100 years.

Since the Monroe Doctrine, the United States gained a major influence on most Caribbean nations. In the early part of the 20th century this influence was extended by participation in the Banana Wars. Victory in the Spanish–American War and the signing of the Platt Amendment in 1901 ensured that the United States would have the right to interfere in Cuban political and economic affairs, militarily if necessary. After the Cuban Revolution of 1959, relations deteriorated rapidly leading to the Bay of Pigs Invasion, the Cuban Missile Crisis, and successive US attempts to destabilize the island, based upon Cold War fears of the Soviet threat. The US invaded and occupied Hispaniola for 19 years (1915–34), subsequently dominating the Haitian economy through aid and loan repayments. The US invaded Haiti again in 1994 and in 2004 were accused by CARICOM of arranging a coup d'état to remove elected Haitian leader Jean-Bertrand Aristide. In 1965, 23,000 US troops were sent to the Dominican Republic to quash a local uprising against military rule (see Dominican Civil War). President Lyndon Johnson had ordered the invasion to stem what he deemed to be a "Communist threat." However, the mission appeared ambiguous and was roundly condemned throughout the hemisphere as a return to gunboat diplomacy. In 1983, the US invaded Grenada to remove populist left-wing leader Maurice Bishop. The US maintains a naval military base in Cuba at Guantanamo Bay. The base is one of five unified commands whose "area of responsibility" is Latin America and the Caribbean. The command is headquartered in Miami, Florida.

Geography and geology

The geography and climate in the Caribbean region varies: Some islands in the region have relatively flat terrain of non-volcanic origin. These islands include Aruba (possessing only minor volcanic features), Curaçao, Barbados, Bonaire, the Cayman Islands, Saint Croix, the Bahamas, and Antigua. Others possess rugged towering mountain-ranges like the islands of Saint Martin, Cuba, Hispaniola, Puerto Rico, Jamaica, Dominica, Montserrat, Saba, Sint Eustatius, Saint Kitts, Saint Lucia, Saint Thomas, Saint John, Tortola, Grenada, Saint Vincent, Guadeloupe, Martinique and Trinidad and Tobago.

Definitions of the terms Greater Antilles and Lesser Antilles often vary. The Virgin Islands as part of the Puerto Rican bank are sometimes included with the Greater Antilles. The term Lesser Antilles is often used to define an island arc that includes Grenada but excludes Trinidad and Tobago and the Leeward Antilles.

The waters of the Caribbean Sea host large, migratory schools of fish, turtles, and coral reef formations. The Puerto Rico Trench, located on the fringe of the Atlantic Ocean and Caribbean Sea just to the north of the island of Puerto Rico, is the deepest point in all of the Atlantic Ocean.

The region sits in the line of several major shipping routes with the Panama Canal connecting the western Caribbean Sea with the Pacific Ocean.

Climate

The climate of the area is tropical, varying from tropical rainforest in some areas to tropical monsoon and tropical savanna in others. There are also some locations that are arid climates with considerable drought in some years, and the peaks of mountains tend to have cooler temperate climates.

Rainfall varies with elevation, size and water currents, such as the cool upwellings that keep the ABC islands arid. Warm, moist trade winds blow consistently from the east, creating both rain forest and semi arid climates across the region. The tropical rainforest climates include lowland areas near the Caribbean Sea from Costa Rica north to Belize, as well as the Dominican Republic and Puerto Rico, while the more seasonal dry tropical savanna climates are found in Cuba, northern  Colombia and Venezuela, and southern Yucatán, Mexico. Arid climates are found along the extreme northern coast of Venezuela out to the islands including Aruba and Curacao, as well as the northwestern tip of Yucatán.

While the region generally is sunny much of the year, the wet season from May through November sees more frequent cloud cover (both broken and overcast), while the dry season from December through April is more often clear to mostly sunny. Seasonal rainfall is divided into 'dry' and 'wet' seasons, with the latter six months of the year being wetter than the first half. The air temperature is hot much of the year, varying from 25 to 33 C (77 F to 90 F) between the wet and dry seasons. Seasonally, monthly mean temperatures vary from only about 5 C (7 F) in the northern most regions, to less than 3 C  in the southernmost areas of the Caribbean.

Hurricane season is from June to November, but they occur more frequently in August and September and more common in the northern islands of the Caribbean. Hurricanes that sometimes batter the region usually strike northwards of Grenada and to the west of Barbados. The principal hurricane belt arcs to northwest of the island of Barbados in the Eastern Caribbean. A great example being recent events of Hurricane Irma devastating the island of Saint Martin during the 2017 hurricane season.

Sea surface temperatures change little annually, normally running from 30 °C (87 °F) in the warmest months to 26 °C (76 °F) in the coolest months. The air temperature is warm year round, in the 70s, 80s and 90s, and only varies from winter to summer about 2–5 degrees on the southern islands and about a 10–20 degrees difference on the northern islands of the Caribbean. The northern islands, like the Bahamas, Cuba, Puerto Rico and the Dominican Republic, may be influenced by continental masses during winter months, such as cold fronts.

Aruba: Latitude 12°N

Puerto Rico: Latitude 18°N

Cuba: at Latitude 22°N

Island groups
Lucayan Archipelago
 
  (United Kingdom)
Greater Antilles
  (United Kingdom)
 
 Hispaniola
 
 
 
  (U.S. Commonwealth)
 Spanish Virgin Islands
Lesser Antilles
 Leeward Islands
   (U.S.)
 Saint Croix
 Saint Thomas
 Saint John
 Water Island
  (United Kingdom)
 Tortola
 Virgin Gorda
 Anegada
 Jost Van Dyke
  (United Kingdom)
 
 Antigua
 Barbuda
 Redonda
 Saint Martin, politically divided between
  (France)
  (Kingdom of the Netherlands)
  (Caribbean Netherlands, Netherlands)
  (Caribbean Netherlands, Netherlands)
  (French Antilles, France)
 
 Saint Kitts
 Nevis
  (United Kingdom)
  (French Antilles, France) including
 Les Saintes
 Marie-Galante
 La Désirade
 Windward Islands
 
  (French Antilles, France)
 
 
 Saint Vincent
 The Grenadines
 
 Grenada
 Carriacou and Petite Martinique
 

 Tobago
 Trinidad
 Leeward Antilles
  (Kingdom of the Netherlands)
  (Kingdom of the Netherlands)
  (Caribbean Netherlands, Netherlands)
  (Venezuela)

Historical groupings

All islands at some point were, and a few still are, colonies of European nations; a few are overseas or dependent territories:
 British West Indies/Anglophone Caribbean – Anguilla, Antigua and Barbuda, Bahamas, Barbados, Bay Islands, Guyana, Belize, British Virgin Islands, Cayman Islands, Dominica, Grenada, Jamaica, Montserrat, Saint Croix (briefly), Saint Kitts and Nevis, Saint Lucia, Saint Vincent and the Grenadines, Trinidad and Tobago (from 1797) and the Turks and Caicos Islands
 Danish West Indies – Possession of Denmark-Norway before 1814, then Denmark, present-day United States Virgin Islands
 Dutch West Indies – Aruba, Bonaire, Curaçao, Saba, Sint Eustatius, Sint Maarten, Bay Islands (briefly), Saint Croix (briefly), Tobago, Surinam and Virgin Islands
 French West Indies – Anguilla (briefly), Antigua and Barbuda (briefly), Dominica, Dominican Republic (briefly), Grenada, Haiti (formerly Saint-Domingue), Montserrat (briefly), Saint Lucia, Saint Vincent and the Grenadines, Sint Eustatius (briefly), Sint Maarten, St. Kitts (briefly), Tobago (briefly), Saint Croix, the current French overseas départements of French Guiana, Martinique and Guadeloupe (including Marie-Galante, La Désirade and Les Saintes), the current French overseas collectivities of Saint Barthélemy and Saint Martin
The Portuguese left Barbados abandoned years before the British arrived.
 Spanish West Indies – Cuba, Hispaniola (present-day Dominican Republic), Haiti (until 1659, lost to France), Puerto Rico, Jamaica (until 1655, lost to Great Britain), the Cayman Islands (until 1670 to Great Britain) Trinidad (until 1797, lost to Great Britain) and Bay Islands (until 1643, lost to Great Britain), coastal islands of Central America (except Belize), and some Caribbean coastal islands of Panama, Colombia, Mexico, and Venezuela.
 Swedish West Indies – present-day French Saint-Barthélemy, Guadeloupe (briefly) and Tobago (briefly).
 Courlander West Indies – Tobago (until 1691)

The British West Indies were united by the United Kingdom into a West Indies Federation between 1958 and 1962. The independent countries formerly part of the B.W.I. still have a joint cricket team that competes in Test matches, One Day Internationals and Twenty20 Internationals. The West Indian cricket team includes the South American nation of Guyana, the only former British colony on the mainland of that continent.

In addition, these countries share the University of the West Indies as a regional entity. The university consists of three main campuses in Jamaica, Barbados and Trinidad and Tobago, a smaller campus in the Bahamas and Resident Tutors in other contributing territories such as Trinidad.

Continental countries with Caribbean coastlines and islands

 
 Ambergris Caye
 Caye Caulker
 Glover's Reef
 Hick's Cayes
 Lighthouse Reef
 St. George's Caye
 Tobacco Caye
 Turneffe Atoll
 
 Archipelago of San Andrés, Providencia and Santa Catalina
Bajo Nuevo Bank
Crab Cay
Quita Sueño Bank
Roncador Bank
Roncador Cay
San Andrés (island)
Santa Catalina Island (Colombia)
Serrana Bank
Serranilla Bank
 Rosario Islands
 
Brava Island, Costa Rica
Isla Calero
Uvita Island
 
 
 
 
 Islas de la Bahía
 Cayos Cochinos
 Guanaja
 Roatán
 Swan Islands
 Útila
Cayos Cochinos
Cayo Gorda
Bobel Cay

 
 Corn Islands
 Miskito Cays
 Pearl Cays
Calala Island
Rama Cay
 
 Archipelago off Guna Yala coast (including the San Blas Islands)
 Bocas del Toro Archipelago (approximately 300 islands)
 Galeta Island (Panama)
Isla Grande
Soledad Miria
Cayos Limones
 
 Quintana Roo
 Banco Chinchorro
 Cozumel
 Isla Blanca
 Isla Contoy
 Isla Holbox
 Isla Mujeres
 
 
 Blanquilla Island
 Coche Island
 Cubagua Island
 Isla Aves
 Islas Los Frailes
 Isla Margarita
 La Orchila
 La Sola Island
 La Tortuga Island
 Las Aves archipelago
 Los Hermanos Archipelago
 Los Monjes Archipelago
 Los Roques archipelago
 Los Testigos Islands
 Patos Island

Biodiversity
The Caribbean islands have one of the most diverse eco systems in the world. The animals, fungi and plants, and have been classified as one of Conservation International's biodiversity hotspots because of their exceptionally diverse terrestrial and marine ecosystems, ranging from montane cloud forests, to tropical rainforest,  to cactus scrublands. The region also contains about 8% (by surface area) of the world's coral reefs along with extensive seagrass meadows, both of which are frequently found in the shallow marine waters bordering the island and continental coasts of the region.

For the fungi, there is a modern checklist based on nearly 90,000 records derived from specimens in reference collections, published accounts and field observations. That checklist includes more than 11,250 species of fungi recorded from the region. As its authors note, the work is far from exhaustive, and it is likely that the true total number of fungal species already known from the Caribbean is higher. The true total number of fungal species occurring in the Caribbean, including species not yet recorded, is likely far higher given the generally accepted estimate that only about 7% of all fungi worldwide have been discovered. Though the amount of available information is still small, a first effort has been made to estimate the number of fungal species endemic to some Caribbean islands. For Cuba, 2200 species of fungi have been tentatively identified as possible endemics of the island; for Puerto Rico, the number is 789 species; for the Dominican Republic, the number is 699 species; for Trinidad and Tobago, the number is 407 species.

Many of the ecosystems of the Caribbean islands have been devastated by deforestation, pollution, and human encroachment. The arrival of the first humans is correlated with extinction of giant owls and dwarf ground sloths. The hotspot contains dozens of highly threatened animals (ranging from birds, to mammals and reptiles), fungi and plants. Examples of threatened animals include the Puerto Rican amazon, two species of solenodon (giant shrews) in Cuba and the Hispaniola island, and the Cuban crocodile.

The region's coral reefs, which contain about 70 species of hard corals and from 500 to 700 species of reef-associated fishes have undergone rapid decline in ecosystem integrity in recent years, and are considered particularly vulnerable to global warming and ocean acidification. According to a UNEP report, the Caribbean coral reefs might get extinct in next 20 years due to population explosion along the coast lines, overfishing, the pollution of coastal areas and global warming.

Some Caribbean islands have terrain that Europeans found suitable for cultivation for agriculture. Tobacco was an important early crop during the colonial era, but was eventually overtaken by sugarcane production as the region's staple crop. Sugar was produced from sugarcane for export to Europe. Cuba and Barbados were historically the largest producers of sugar. The tropical plantation system thus came to dominate Caribbean settlement.  Other islands were found to have terrain unsuited for agriculture, for example Dominica, which remains heavily forested. The islands in the southern Lesser Antilles, Aruba, Bonaire and Curaçao, are extremely arid, making them unsuitable for agriculture. However, they have salt pans that were exploited by the Dutch. Sea water was pumped into shallow ponds, producing coarse salt when the water evaporated.

The natural environmental diversity of the Caribbean islands has led to recent growth in eco-tourism. This type of tourism is growing on islands lacking sandy beaches and dense human populations.

Plants and animals

Demographics

Indigenous groups

 Arawak peoples
 Igneri
 Taíno
 Caquetio people
 Ciboney
 Ciguayo
 Garifuna
 Kalina
 Kalinago
 Lucayan
 Macorix
 Raizal

At the time of European contact, the dominant ethnic groups in the Caribbean included the Taíno of the Greater Antilles and northern Lesser Antilles, the Island Caribs of the southern Lesser Antilles, and smaller distinct groups such as the Guanajatabey of western Cuba and the Ciguayo of eastern Hispaniola. The population of the Caribbean is estimated to have been around 750,000 immediately before European contact, although lower and higher figures are given. After contact, social disruption and epidemic diseases such as smallpox and measles (to which they had no natural immunity) led to a decline in the Amerindian population. such as the Kongo, Igbo, Akan, Fon and Yoruba as well as military prisoners from Ireland, who were deported during the Cromwellian reign in England. Immigrants from Britain, Italy, France, Spain, the Netherlands, Portugal and Denmark also arrived, although the mortality rate was high for both groups.

The population is estimated to have reached 2.2 million by 1800. Immigrants from India, China, Indonesia, and other countries arrived in the mid-19th century as indentured servants.  After the ending of the Atlantic slave trade, the population increased naturally. The total regional population was estimated at 37.5 million by 2000.

In Haiti and most of the French, Anglophone and Dutch Caribbean, the population is predominantly of African origin; on many islands there are also significant populations of mixed racial origin (including Mulatto-Creole, Dougla, Mestizo, Quadroon, Cholo, Castizo, Criollo, Zambo, Pardo, Asian Latin Americans, Chindian, Cocoa panyols, and Eurasian), as well as populations of European ancestry:  Dutch, English, French, Italian, Portuguese and Spanish ancestry. Asians, especially those of Chinese, Indian descent, and Javanese Indonesians, form a significant minority in parts of the region. Indians form a plurality of the population in Trinidad and Tobago, Guyana, and Suriname. Most of their ancestors arrived in the 19th century as indentured laborers.

The Spanish-speaking Caribbean populations are primarily of European, African, or racially mixed origins. Puerto Rico has a European majority with a mixture of European-African-Native American (tri-racial), and a large Mulatto (European-West African) and West African minority. Cuba also has a European majority, along with a significant population of African ancestry. The Dominican Republic has the largest mixed-race population, primarily descended from Europeans, West Africans, and Amerindians.

Jamaica has a large African majority, in addition to a significant population of mixed racial background, and has minorities of Chinese, Europeans, Indians, Latinos, Jews, and Arabs. This is a result of years of importation of slaves and indentured laborers, and migration. Most multi-racial Jamaicans refer to themselves as either mixed race or brown. Similar populations can be found in the Caricom states of Belize, Guyana and Trinidad and Tobago. Trinidad and Tobago has a multi-racial cosmopolitan society due to the arrivals of Africans, Indians, Chinese, Arabs, Jews, Latinos, and Europeans along with the native indigenous Amerindians population. This multi-racial mix of the Caribbean has created sub-ethnicities that often straddle the boundaries of major ethnicities and include Mulatto-Creole, Mestizo, Pardo, Zambo, Dougla, Chindian, Afro-Asians,  Eurasian, Cocoa panyols, and Asian Latinos.

Language

Spanish (64%),  French (25%), English (14%), Dutch, Haitian Creole, and Papiamento are the predominant official languages of various countries in the region, although a handful of unique creole languages or dialects can also be found in virtually every Caribbean country. Other languages such as Caribbean Hindustani, Chinese, Javanese, Arabic, Hmong, Amerindian languages, other African languages, other European languages, and other Indian languages can also be found.

Religion

Christianity is the predominant religion in the Caribbean (84.7%). Other religions in the region are Hinduism, Islam, Judaism, Rastafari, Buddhism, Chinese folk religion (incl. Taoism and Confucianism), Bahá'í, Jainism, Sikhism, Kebatinan, Traditional African religions, Yoruba (incl. Trinidad Orisha), Afro-American religions,  (incl. Santería, Palo, Umbanda, Brujería, Hoodoo, Candomblé, Quimbanda, Orisha, Xangô de Recife, Xangô do Nordeste, Comfa, Espiritismo, Santo Daime, Obeah, Candomblé, Abakuá, Kumina, Winti, Sanse, Cuban Vodú, Dominican Vudú, Louisiana Voodoo, Haitian Vodou, and Vodun).

Politics

Regionalism

Caribbean societies are very different from other Western societies in terms of size, culture, and degree of mobility of their citizens. The current economic and political problems the states face individually are common to all Caribbean states. Regional development has contributed to attempts to subdue current problems and avoid projected problems. From a political and economic perspective, regionalism serves to make Caribbean states active participants in current international affairs through collective coalitions. In 1973, the first political regionalism in the Caribbean Basin was created by advances of the English-speaking Caribbean nations through the institution known as the Caribbean Common Market and Community (CARICOM) which is located in Guyana.

Certain scholars have argued both for and against generalizing the political structures of the Caribbean. On the one hand the Caribbean states are politically diverse, ranging from communist systems such as Cuba toward more capitalist Westminster-style parliamentary systems as in the Commonwealth Caribbean. Other scholars argue that these differences are superficial, and that they tend to undermine commonalities in the various Caribbean states. Contemporary Caribbean systems seem to reflect a "blending of traditional and modern patterns, yielding hybrid systems that exhibit significant structural variations and divergent constitutional traditions yet ultimately appear to function in similar ways." The political systems of the Caribbean states share similar practices.

The influence of regionalism in the Caribbean is often marginalized. Some scholars believe that regionalism cannot exist in the Caribbean because each small state is unique. On the other hand, scholars also suggest that there are commonalities amongst the Caribbean nations that suggest regionalism exists.  "Proximity as well as historical ties among the Caribbean nations has led to cooperation as well as a desire for collective action." These attempts at regionalization reflect the nations' desires to compete in the international economic system.

Furthermore, a lack of interest from other major states promoted regionalism in the region.  In recent years the Caribbean has suffered from a lack of U.S. interest. "With the end of the Cold War, U.S. security and economic interests have been focused on other areas. As a result there has been a significant reduction in U.S. aid and investment to the Caribbean."  The lack of international support for these small, relatively poor states, helped regionalism prosper.

Following the Cold War another issue of importance in the Caribbean has been the reduced economic growth of some Caribbean States due to the United States and European Union's allegations of special treatment toward the region by each other.

United States–EU trade dispute
The United States under President Bill Clinton launched a challenge in the World Trade Organization against the EU over Europe's preferential program, known as the Lomé Convention, which allowed banana exports from the former colonies of the Group of African, Caribbean and Pacific states (ACP) to enter Europe cheaply. The World Trade Organization sided in the United States' favour and the beneficial elements of the convention to African, Caribbean and Pacific states has been partially dismantled and replaced by the Cotonou Agreement.

During the US/EU dispute, the United States imposed large tariffs on European Union goods (up to 100%) to pressure Europe to change the agreement with the Caribbean nations in favour of the Cotonou Agreement.

Farmers in the Caribbean have complained of falling profits and rising costs as the Lomé Convention weakens.  Some farmers have faced increased pressure to turn towards the cultivation of illegal drugs, which has a higher profit margin and fills the sizable demand for these illegal drugs in North America and Europe.

Caribbean Financial Action Task Force and Association of Caribbean States
Caribbean nations have also started to more closely cooperate in the Caribbean Financial Action Task Force and other instruments to add oversight of the offshore industry. One of the most important associations that deal with regionalism amongst the nations of the Caribbean Basin has been the Association of Caribbean States (ACS). Proposed by CARICOM in 1992, the ACS soon won the support of the other countries of the region.  It was founded in July 1994.  The ACS maintains regionalism within the Caribbean on issues unique to the Caribbean Basin. Through coalition building, like the ACS and CARICOM, regionalism has become an undeniable part of the politics and economics of the Caribbean.  The successes of region-building initiatives are still debated by scholars, yet regionalism remains prevalent throughout the Caribbean.

Bolivarian Alliance
The President of Venezuela, Hugo Chavez launched an economic group called the Bolivarian Alliance for the Americas (ALBA), which several eastern Caribbean islands joined.  In 2012, the nation of Haiti, with 9 million people, became the largest CARICOM nation that sought to join the union.

Regional institutions
Here are some of the bodies that several islands share in collaboration:

 African, Caribbean and Pacific Group of States
 Association of Caribbean States (ACS), Trinidad and Tobago
 Caribbean Association of Industry and Commerce (CAIC), Trinidad and Tobago
 Caribbean Association of National Telecommunication Organizations (CANTO), Trinidad and Tobago
 Caribbean Community (CARICOM), Guyana
 Caribbean Development Bank (CDB), Barbados
 Caribbean Disaster Emergency Management Agency (CDERA), Barbados
 Caribbean Educators Network
 Caribbean Electric Utility Services Corporation (CARILEC), Saint Lucia
 Caribbean Examinations Council (CXC), Barbados and Jamaica
 Caribbean Financial Action Task Force (CFATF), Trinidad and Tobago
 Caribbean Food Crops Society, Puerto Rico
 Caribbean Football Union (CFU), Jamaica
 Caribbean Hotel & Tourism Association (CHTA), Florida and Puerto Rico
 Caribbean Initiative (Initiative of the IUCN)
 Caribbean Programme for Economic Competitiveness (CPEC), Saint Lucia
 Caribbean Regional Environmental Programme (CREP), Barbados
 Caribbean Regional Fisheries Mechanism (CRFM), Belize
 Caribbean Regional Negotiating Machinery (CRNM), Barbados and Dominican Republic
 Caribbean Telecommunications Union (CTU), Trinidad and Tobago
 Caribbean Tourism Organization (CTO), Barbados
 Community of Latin American and Caribbean States (CELAC)
 Foundation for the Development of Caribbean Children, Barbados
 Latin America and Caribbean Network Information Centre (LACNIC), Brazil and Uruguay
 Latin American and the Caribbean Economic System, Venezuela
 Organisation of Eastern Caribbean States (OECS), Saint Lucia
 United Nations Economic Commission for Latin America and the Caribbean (ECLAC), Chile and Trinidad and Tobago
 University of the West Indies, Jamaica, Barbados, Trinidad and Tobago.  In addition, the fourth campus, the Open Campus was formed in June 2008 as a result of an amalgamation of the Board for Non-Campus Countries and Distance Education, Schools of Continuing Studies, the UWI Distance Education Centres and Tertiary Level Units.  The Open Campus has 42 physical sites in 16 Anglophone caribbean countries.
 West Indies Cricket Board, Antigua and Barbuda

Cuisine

Favourite or national dishes

 Anguilla – rice, peas and fish
 Antigua and Barbuda – fungee and pepperpot
 Bahamas – Guava duff, Conch Salad, Peas n' Rice, and Conch Fritters
 Barbados – cou-cou and flying fish
 Belize – rice and beans, stew chicken with potato salad; white rice, stew beans and fry fish with cole slaw
 British Virgin Islands – fish and fungee
 Cayman Islands – turtle stew, turtle steak, grouper
 Colombian Caribbean – rice with coconut milk, arroz con pollo, sancocho, Arab cuisine (due to the large Arab population)
 Cuba – platillo Moros y Cristianos, ropa vieja, lechon, maduros, ajiaco
 Dominica – mountain chicken, rice and peas, dumplings, saltfish, dashin, bakes (fried dumplings), coconut confiture, curry goat, cassava farine, oxtail
 Dominican Republic – arroz con pollo with stewed red kidney beans, pan fried or braised beef, salad/ ensalada de coditos, empanadas, mangú, sancocho
 Grenada – oil down, Roti and rice & chicken
 Guyana – roti and curry, pepperpot, cookup rice, methem, pholourie
 Haiti – griot (fried pork) served with du riz a pois or diri ak pwa (rice and beans)
 Jamaica – ackee and saltfish, callaloo, jerk chicken, curry chicken
 Montserrat – Goat water
 Puerto Rico – yellow rice with green pigeon peas, saltfish stew, roasted pork shoulder, chicken fricassée, mofongo, tripe soup, alcapurria, coconut custard, rice pudding, guava turnovers, Mallorca bread
 Saint Kitts and Nevis – goat water, coconut dumplings, spicy plantain, saltfish, breadfruit
 Saint Lucia – callaloo, dal roti, dried and salted cod, green bananas, rice and beans
 Saint Vincent and the Grenadines – roasted breadfruit and fried jackfish
 Suriname – brown beans and rice, roti and curry, peanut soup, battered fried plantain with peanut sauce, nasi goreng, moksie alesi, bara, pom
 Trinidad and Tobago – doubles, curry with roti or dal bhat, aloo pie, phulourie, callaloo, bake and shark, curry crab and dumpling
 United States Virgin Islands – stewed goat, oxtail or beef, seafood, callaloo, fungee
 Venezuela Caribbean – fried fish with salad and rise, tostones, sancocho, patacon, pabellon

See also 

 African diaspora
 Anchor coinage
 British African-Caribbean people
 British Indo-Caribbean people
 Caribbean people
 Climate change in the Caribbean
 CONCACAF
 Council on Hemispheric Affairs
 Culture of the Caribbean
 Economy of the Caribbean
 Indian diaspora
 Indo-Caribbean
 Indo-Caribbean American
 List of Caribbean music genres
 List of sovereign states and dependent territories in the Caribbean
 NECOBELAC Project
 Non-resident Indian and person of Indian origin
 Piracy in the Caribbean
 Politics of the Caribbean
 Tourism in the Caribbean

Geography:
 Americas (terminology)
 List of archipelagos by number of islands
 List of Caribbean islands
 List of indigenous names of Eastern Caribbean islands
 List of mountain peaks of the Caribbean
 List of Ultras of the Caribbean
 Middle America (Americas)
 Latin America and the Caribbean (region)

Notes

References

Bibliography 
 Engerman, Stanley L. "A Population History of the Caribbean", pp. 483–528 in A Population History of North America Michael R. Haines and Richard Hall Steckel (Eds.), Cambridge University Press, 2000, .
 Hillman, Richard S., and Thomas J. D'agostino, eds. Understanding the Contemporary Caribbean, London: Lynne Rienner, 2003 .

Further reading 
 Develtere, Patrick R. 1994. "Co-operation and development: With special reference to the experience of the Commonwealth Caribbean" ACCO, 
 Gowricharn, Ruben. Caribbean Transnationalism: Migration, Pluralization, and Social Cohesion. Lanham: Lexington Books, 2006.
 Henke, Holger, and Fred Reno, eds. Modern Political Culture in the Caribbean. Kingston: University of West Indies Press, 2003.
 Heuman, Gad. The Caribbean: Brief Histories. London: A Hodder Arnold Publication, 2006.
 de Kadt, Emanuel, (editor). Patterns of foreign influence in the Caribbean, Oxford University Press, 1972.
 Knight, Franklin W. The Modern Caribbean (University of North Carolina Press, 1989).
 Kurlansky, Mark. 1992. A Continent of Islands: Searching for the Caribbean Destiny. Addison-Wesley Publishing. 
 Langley, Lester D. The United States and the Caribbean in the Twentieth Century. London: University of Georgia Press, 1989.
 Maingot, Anthony P. The United States and the Caribbean: Challenges of an Asymmetrical Relationship. Westview Press, 1994.
 Palmie, Stephan, and Francisco A. Scarano, eds. The Caribbean: A History of the Region and Its Peoples (University of Chicago Press; 2011); 660 pp.; writings on the region since the pre-Columbia era.
 Ramnarine, Tina K. Beautiful Cosmos: Performance and Belonging in the Caribbean Diaspora. London, Pluto Press, 2007.
 Rowntree, Lester/Martin Lewis/Marie Price/William Wyckoff. Diversity Amid Globalization: World Regions, Environment, Development, 4th edition, 2008.

External links 

 
 Digital Library of the Caribbean
 Latin American, Caribbean, U.S. Latinx, and Iberian Online Free E-Resources (LACLI). 
 Manioc, open access digital Library, books, images, conferences, articles about the Caribbean 
 Federal Research Division of the U.S. Library of Congress: Caribbean Islands (1987)
 LANIC Caribbean country pages